The enzyme phosphatidylglycerophosphatase (EC 3.1.3.27) catalyzes the following reaction: 

phosphatidylglycerophosphate + H2O  phosphatidylglycerol + phosphate

This enzyme belongs to the family of hydrolases, specifically those acting on phosphoric monoester bonds.  The systematic name is phosphatidylglycerophosphate phosphohydrolase. Other names in common use include phosphatidylglycerol phosphate phosphatase, phosphatidylglycerol phosphatase, and PGP phosphatase.  It participates in glycerophospholipid metabolism.

This is a family of proteins that acts as a mitochondrial phosphatase in cardiolipin biosynthesis. Cardiolipin is a unique dimeric phosphoglycerolipid predominantly present in mitochondrial membranes.

References

EC 3.1.3
Enzymes of unknown structure